Andrew Blake may refer to:
Andrew Blake (scientist) (born 1956), British computer scientist
Andrew Blake (director) (born 1948), American adult film director
Andrew Blake (footballer) (born 1996), New Zealand footballer
Andy Blake series of books by Edward Edson Lee
Andrew Blake (MP), in 1413 and 1419, MP for Lewes (UK Parliament constituency)